David Frizzell (born September 26, 1941) is an American country music singer. He is the younger brother of country musician, Lefty Frizzell. His career started in the late 1950s, but his biggest success came in the 1980s.

Biography
Frizzell was born in El Dorado, Arkansas, United States. He began performing in his brother's show at the age of 12. He toured with his brother throughout the 1950s and 1960s and served in the U.S. Air Force during the Vietnam War. He signed with Columbia Records in 1970 and finally achieved solo success, placing the single "I Just Can't Help Believing" on the Billboard top-40 country chart.

Frizzell appeared regularly on Buck Owens' All American TV Show during the 1970s, and recorded for Capitol Records. In 1981, he recorded his first number-one country hit, "You're the Reason God Made Oklahoma," a duet with Shelly West. The song won the Country Music Association's Song of the Year and Vocal Duet of the Year awards in 1981, was nominated for a Grammy Award for Best Country Performance by a Duo or Group with Vocal, and was featured in Clint Eastwood's film Any Which Way You Can. Frizzell and West also won the Academy of Country Music award for Vocal Duo of the Year in 1981 and 1982.

In August 1982, Frizzell scored his only solo number-one country single with "I'm Gonna Hire a Wino to Decorate Our Home". He continued to tour and record with West until 1986.

After he parted ways with Shelly West, Frizzell continued to record solo albums, but he has not kept up the popularity he enjoyed during the early 1980s. Notwithstanding, he continues to record and tour.

Discography

Albums

Singles

A"I'm Gonna Hire a Wino to Decorate Our Home" also peaked at No. 20 on the RPM Top Singles chart in Canada.

Singles with Shelly West

Music videos

References

Bibliography
 Bush, John (2003). Edited by Vladimir Bogdanov, Chris Woodstra, & Stephen Erlewine. "David Frizzell." All Music Guide to Country, 2nd ed. San Francisco: Backbeat Books, 2003. 
 Whitburn, Joel. "The Billboard Book of Top 40 Country Hits" New York: Billboard Publications Inc., 1996.

External links
 Official website

1941 births
American male singer-songwriters
American country singer-songwriters
Capitol Records artists
Columbia Records artists
Country musicians from Arkansas
Living people
MCA Records artists
People from El Dorado, Arkansas
RSO Records artists
Singer-songwriters from Arkansas
Warner Records artists